is a railway station in the city of Nikkō, Tochigi, Japan, operated by the Watarase Keikoku Railway.

Lines

Station layout
The station consists of a single side platform serving traffic in both directions.

Adjacent stations

History
Tsūdō Station opened on 31 December 1912 as a station on the Ashio Railway. The station building and platform received protection by the national government as a national Registered Tangible Cultural Property in 2009.

Surrounding area
Ashio Copper Mine is 5 minutes on foot from this station.
former Ashio Town Hall
Ashio Post Office

See also
 List of railway stations in Japan

References

External links

 Station information (Watarase Keikoku) 

Railway stations in Tochigi Prefecture
Railway stations in Japan opened in 1912
Nikkō, Tochigi
Registered Tangible Cultural Properties